Boman Bi Irie Aimé (born 16 August 1989) is an Ivorian professional footballer who plays as defender.

Career
He has played professional for Côte d'Ivoire Premier Division club side Société Omnisports de l'Armée. and He played in Indonesia Super League for PSM Makassar. and now, He played in Liga 1 Indonesia for Perseru Serui.

References

External links
Boman Irie Aimé at taumaturg.jimdo.com
 Boman Irie Aimé at liga-indonesia.co.id

1989 births
Living people
Ivorian footballers
Ivorian expatriate sportspeople in Indonesia
Expatriate footballers in Indonesia
Liga 1 (Indonesia) players
Société Omnisports de l'Armée players
PSM Makassar players
People from Lagunes District
Association football defenders